William Gray (June 27, 1750 (old style; July 8, 1750 new style)– November 4, 1825) was a Massachusetts merchant and politician. Born into a lower-class family in Lynn, Massachusetts, he managed to build his own business and rise through the state's political ranks, becoming the richest man in New England, and in the eyes of many the richest man in all of America. Prior to the War of 1812, William Gray had the largest private fleet in the United States with 60 square-rigged vessels.

Gray first served as a state senator, before becoming the ninth Lieutenant Governor of Massachusetts, serving from 1810 to 1812. He married Elizabeth Chipman (May, 1756 - September 24, 1823) in 1782. Elizabeth was a pioneer in philanthropy, volunteering a significant portion of her time to helping the poorest citizens of Boston.

In 1820, he was elected a member of the American Antiquarian Society

He owned Gray's Wharf in Charlestown. In Boston "he lived on Summer Street, in the mansion previously occupied by Governor Sullivan."

Elizabeth and William had three sons and one daughter:
 William Rufus Gray (1783-1831), a merchant.
 Henry Gray, a merchant. (1784-1854)
 Lucia Gray Swett (1788-1844)
 Francis Calley Gray (1790–1856), a politician, writer, orator, art collector.
 John Chipman Gray, (1793-1881) a politician 
 Horace (1801–1873), father of Supreme Court of the United States associate justice, Horace Gray, and of Harvard Law School professor, John Chipman Gray

References

Further reading
Gray, Edward.: William Gray, of Salem, merchant: a biographical sketch (.1914)

1750 births
1825 deaths
Massachusetts state senators
Lieutenant Governors of Massachusetts
Members of the Massachusetts House of Representatives
19th century in Boston
Members of the American Antiquarian Society